Franz Berger (24 January 1940 – 8 January 2012) was an Austrian wrestler who competed in the 1960 Summer Olympics, in the 1964 Summer Olympics, in the 1968 Summer Olympics, and in the 1972 Summer Olympics.

References

External links
Franz Berger's obituary
 

1940 births
2012 deaths
Olympic wrestlers of Austria
Wrestlers at the 1960 Summer Olympics
Wrestlers at the 1964 Summer Olympics
Wrestlers at the 1968 Summer Olympics
Wrestlers at the 1972 Summer Olympics
Austrian male sport wrestlers